Federal Governmental Institution — penal colony № 56 OIK-2 OUKHD Federal Penitentiary Service of Russia in Sverdlovsk Oblast, popularly known as Black Eagle, was a prison in Ivdel, Sverdlovsk Oblast, Russia. It was a maximum-security Supermax prison operated by the Federal Penitentiary Service for convicts sentenced to life imprisonment.

The head of the colony (as of November 2018) is Colonel of the Internal Service Dadashov Subhan Dadashbala oglu. The filling limit is 499 places, including the colony-settlement section with 40 places.

In Soviet times, this was the only colony in which criminals sentenced to an exceptional sentence of imprisonment (IMN) were serving their sentences, by which the execution was replaced by a 20-year imprisonment in the colony of a special (the most severe in the USSR) regime. With the advent of life sentences in the colony, an additional building was opened. The "Black Golden Eagle" is divided into two parts. One contains those who have been sentenced for serious crimes to 20–25 years in prison, the other contains those sentenced to life imprisonment. In 2011, it was planned to build a new building for life prisoners, designed for 300 places. In 2019 the prison was closed.

References

Buildings and structures in Sverdlovsk Oblast
Camps of the Gulag
Defunct prisons in Russia